Trans Thailand–Malaysia Gas Pipeline (TTM) is a gas pipeline linking suppliers in Malaysia to consumers in Thailand.  It is a part of the Trans-ASEAN Gas Pipeline project.

History
The pipeline and gas separation project began in February 2000 to transport and process natural gas from the gas reserves in the Thai-Malaysia joint offshore development area.

Construction on the pipeline started in mid-2003 and was completed in 2006-2007. It was built by the Trans Thai-Malaysia (Thailand) Ltd., a project company of Petronas and the PTT Public Company Limited.

Description
The TTM project consists of the gas pipeline project and the Songkhla Gas Separation Plant project geared to making LPG.

Thailand also has two existing pipelines with Myanmar and a third under construction.

See also
 List of natural gas pipelines
 List of LNG terminals

References

External links
 Trans Thailand Malaysian Gas Pipeline

Natural gas pipelines in Thailand
Natural gas pipelines in Malaysia
Malaysia–Thailand relations
Foreign trade of Thailand